Hellinsia spiculibursa is a moth of the plume moth or Pterophoridae family . It is found in Venezuela.

Adults are on wing in June and July.

References

Moths described in 1996
spiculibursa
Moths of South America